Joseph Calvitt Clarke Jr. (August 9, 1920 – May 6, 2004) was a United States district judge of the United States District Court for the Eastern District of Virginia.

Education and career

Clarke was born on August 9, 1920 in Harrisburg, Pennsylvania. He received a Bachelor of Science degree from the University of Virginia in 1945 and a Bachelor of Laws from the University of Virginia School of Law in 1945. He was in private practice in Richmond, Virginia from 1945 to 1975.

Federal judicial service

On December 11, 1974, Clarke was nominated by President Gerald Ford to a seat on the United States District Court for the Eastern District of Virginia vacated by Judge Walter Edward Hoffman. He was confirmed by the United States Senate on December 19, 1974, and received his commission on December 20, 1974. He assumed senior status on July 31, 1991. He served in that capacity until his death on May 6, 2004, in Virginia Beach, Virginia.

References

Sources

1920 births
2004 deaths
People from Harrisburg, Pennsylvania
Lawyers from Richmond, Virginia
People from Virginia Beach, Virginia
University of Virginia alumni
Judges of the United States District Court for the Eastern District of Virginia
United States district court judges appointed by Gerald Ford
20th-century American judges
University of Virginia School of Law alumni